Terence Poole (born 16 December 1949) is an English former professional footballer who played as a goalkeeper in the Football League for Huddersfield Town, Bolton Wanderers and Sheffield United. Born in Chesterfield, he started his career at Manchester United but never appeared for the first team.

References

1949 births
Living people
Footballers from Chesterfield
English footballers
Association football goalkeepers
Manchester United F.C. players
Huddersfield Town A.F.C. players
Bolton Wanderers F.C. players
Sheffield United F.C. players
English Football League players